The Green Planet is a "bio-dome" (indoor zoo and garden) in the City Walk area of Dubai, United Arab Emirates. It has over 3,000 plants and animals in an artificial tropical rainforest including birds, reptiles, and fish. They are kept in open environments, but may not be touched.

The Green Planet indoor ecosystem was opened in 2016, with 3,000 plants and animals. The attraction was created by Meraas.

The bio-dome is cube-shaped and was built as an expansion to CityWalk on Al Wasl Road. It is 60,000 square feet in area and the building's exterior is divided into two parts diagonally. One part is cylindrical with glass, while the other is covered with small circular apertures.

At the centre of the bio-dome, there is an 82-foot (25-meter) tall tree with an artificial trunk. A small bridge connects to the tree, which can only hold up to four people at a time. There is also an artificial waterfall. Visitors enter on the fourth floor via a lift and walk down using a spiral slope. In addition, there is a lift and stairs to access animals in the basement. Reptiles are on display at every level, with information about them.

Animals on display include sloths, flying foxes, Seba bats, anaconda snakes, and a bearcat. It is possible for visitors to camp overnight at The Green Planet.

See also
 List of tourist attractions in Dubai

References

External links

 Official website
 "The Green Planet Dubai" – Indoor Rainforest Review video on YouTube
 The Green Planet: Transport yourself to a world of nature and wonder video from Khaleej Times

2016 establishments in the United Arab Emirates
Zoos established in 2016
Zoos in the United Arab Emirates
Tourist attractions in Dubai
Buildings and structures in Dubai
Artificial trees
Greenhouses